The Palace of Florence Apartments is a historic structure in Tampa, Florida, USA. The 28-unit apartment building is located on Tampa's Davis Islands at 45 Davis Boulevard.

Architecture 

Construction on The Palace of Florence began in 1925.  Its Mediterranean Revival architecture mixes medieval and classical elements to reproduce the look of a grand scale Italian palazzo, and includes a dramatic four-story battlement tower with exterior staircase.  The design, by artist Athos Menaboni, is loosely based on that of the Palazzo Vecchio in Florence, Italy., hence the building's name.

Historic Status 

On August 3, 1989, The Palace of Florence Apartments were among several Davis Islands properties included in a Multiple Property Submission(or MPS) to be listed with the U.S. National Register of Historic Places.  The MPS, named "Mediterranean Revival Style Buildings of Davis Islands", included a total of twenty-three historic structures, which were among the first ever built on the newly accessible Davis Islands during the Florida land boom of the 1920s.

The Palace of Florence Apartments underwent a complete restoration between 2002-2003.

References

External links
 Hillsborough County listings at National Register of Historic Places
 Hillsborough County listings at Florida's Office of Cultural and Historical Programs

Buildings and structures in Tampa, Florida
National Register of Historic Places in Tampa, Florida
Apartment buildings in Florida
Mediterranean Revival architecture of Davis Islands, Tampa, Florida
Residential buildings on the National Register of Historic Places in Florida
1925 establishments in Florida